Marylou Mayniel (born 23 April 1993), better known by her stage name Oklou (ˈəʊˈkeɪ luː), is a French musician, singer, music producer, DJ, composer, and actress.

Early life
Marylou Maniel was born on 23 April 1993, in Poitiers, France. Mayniel grew up in the countryside of western France with her two parents and an older brother.

She was classically trained in piano and cello and sang in choirs as a child.

Career

2014–2019: Early beginnings 
Mayniel self-released her debut EP, Avril, in June 2014, under the moniker Loumar.

She moved to Paris in 2015, and self-released her first Oklou EP, First Tape, alongside a limited run of cassettes. After meeting in late 2015, Mayniel co-founded the female DJ collective TGAF (These Girls Are on Fiyah), alongside DJ Ouai, Miley Serious, and Carin Kelly. They would play weekly radio shows on French station PIIAF and live shows around Paris. The group gained a notable following in its formative years, appearing in many online publication features. TGAF disbanded in July 2018.

Mayniel acted in the short film After School Knife Fight in 2017. The film received a festival release from 2017 to 2018. In December 2017, Mayniel released her collaborative EP with Canadian musician and close collaborator Casey MQ, titled For the Beasts. This marked their first collaboration. The EP was released via the Permalnk label. In early 2018, Mayniel became associated with record label and collective, NUXXE, and its co-founders, Scottish music producer Sega Bodega, British rapper Shygirl and French producer and performer Coucou Chloe. She released her third EP, The Rite of May, via the label in March of that year. It featured collaborations with Sega Bodega, Rodaidh McDonald, Krampf and Bok Bok. Later that year, Mayniel and Krampf co-created the video game, Zone W/O People. It was made as a part of Red Bull Music Academy France's 2018 Diggin’ in the Carts event. Mayniel also produced a soundtrack for the game, which she later released on a limited cassette. Mayniel also appeared on the late American rapper Chynna’s October 2018 single "Xternal Locus".

Throughout 2019, Mayniel played at various festivals, such as Loom Festival and Pitchfork's Paris Music Festival. She also released a single, titled "Forever", via TaP Records in October. It was co-produced with Sega Bodega.

2020–present: Galore and collaborations 
In January 2020, Mayniel released a collaborative single with French experimentalist Flavien Berger, titled "Toyota", via Because Music. It is currently Mayniel's only French-language release. This was followed by another single in February, titled "entertnmnt", which was co-produced with British producer Mura Masa, and another single in April, titled "SGSY" (standing for She's Gonna Slaughter You). The singles were released via TaP Records and True Panther Sounds.

Mayniel announced her debut mixtape Galore in July 2020, sharing three tracks, one of which ("unearth me") was accompanied with a music video. Another three tracks from the mixtape were released in August 2020, alongside a music video for the "god’s chariots" track. The full mixtape was released 24 September 2020, via Because Music, TaP Records and True Panther Sounds. The tape was made primarily in collaboration with Casey MQ, but also featured collaborations with Sega Bodega, Shygirl, PC Music’s A. G. Cook and EASYFUN, and GRADES. It also appeared on Gorilla vs. Bear, Rough Trade, and Dummy Mag’s 2020 year-end lists. Additionally in 2020, Mayniel released remixes of Caroline Polachek’s "Door", and Dua Lipa’s "Fever".

Mayniel produced a remix of French singer Pomme’s "les cours d’eau" track in January 2021, followed by a remix of Swedish rapper Bladee and producer Mechatok's "Rainbow" track in March 2021. Mayniel appeared on A. G. Cook's Apple vs. 7G remix album in May 2020, covering "Being Harsh" from Cook's 2020 7G album. She also released remixes of her tracks "fall" and "galore", by Cook. Mayniel toured across the US supporting Caroline Polachek from November through to December of 2021. A remix EP celebrating Galore's anniversary was released on 13 October, featuring an extended mix of "asturias", and two remixes from Casey MQ, and Pomme & Danny L Harle.

She appeared on Flume's Palaces album in May 2022, on the song "Highest Building". She supported him on the album's tour through the United States.

Discography

Mixtapes

EPs

Singles

Remixes

Guest appearances

References

External links 
 

21st-century French women musicians
French producers
Living people
1993 births